Johann Josef Spitzeder (–1832) was a German actor and singer. A popular artist in his own right, he is today mostly remembered for being the father of confidence trickster and actress Adele Spitzeder.

Spitzeder's year of birth is unclear. According to the Austrian Biographical Lexicon 1815–1950, Spitzeder was born on 2 September 1794 in Bonn. His entry in the Allgemeine Deutsche Biographie quotes a contemporary source as saying that he was born in 1795, similarly in Bonn, while the Directory of German Biography gives his birth year as 1796 and his place of birth as Kassel.

He was educated by Joseph Weigl in Vienna where he got his start as an opera singer in 1816. Also in 1816, he married Henriette Spitzeder (née Schüler), a talented soprano. Both were hired together in 1819 to play at the Theater an der Wien where Spitzeder excelled in buffo roles. The couple was engaged by the Königsstädtisches Theaterin Berlin in 1824. After the death of his first wife during childbirth in 1828, he married the opera singer Betty Vio. Spitzeder died on 13 December 1832 in Munich, shortly after being called to work at the Bavarian State Opera.

Notes

References 

 
 
 
 

1790s births
Year of birth uncertain
1832 deaths
19th-century German male actors
19th-century German male opera singers